The Takhti Stadium Khorramabad is a football stadium in Khorramabad, Lorestan, Iran with a 8,900 seating capacity. Takhti Stadium is home venue of Kheybar Khorramabad after opening in 2005. It is named after Gholamreza Takhti.

Building
The stadium holds 8,900 people and has green seats. The stadium is located near to the Zagros Mountains.

Events
The stadium hosts all home games of Kheybar Khorramabad in Azadegan League. Furthermore, it hosts some cultural events.

Sports venues in Iran
Football venues in Iran
Buildings and structures in Khorramabad